Two for the Money may refer to: 

 Two for the Money (2005 film), a 2005 American sports-drama film
 Two for the Money (1972 film), a 1972 American TV film
 Two for the Money (game show), an American game show